The lakes of Bhutan comprise its glacial lakes and its natural mountain lakes. Bhutanese territory contains some 2,674 high altitude glacial lakes and subsidiary lakes, out of which 25 pose a risk of GLOFs.

As phenomena of nature, all lakes in Bhutan are believed to be inhabited by spirits. A handful of lakes in Bhutan are particularly sacred, most often connected to lives of Buddhist saints Guru Rimpoche and Pema Lingpa. For example, Membar Tsho ("Burning Lake"), in the Tang Valley near Bumthang, is heavily associated with Guru Rimpoche, who brought Buddhism to Bhutan and discovered his first terma in the lake in 1475.

Most natural lake names are denoted with the word tsho, meaning "lake" (Dzongkha: མཚོ་; Wylie: mtsho). They may be identified as an individuals, pairs, or groups of lakes.

Glaciers and glacial lakes

Bhutan contains some 2,674 glacial lakes. Some glacial lakes, such as Thorthormi Lake in Lunana Gewog, are not a single bodies of water but collections supraglacial ponds. Most glacial lakes identified as potentially dangerous feed into the Manas River and Puna Tsang (Sankosh) River water systems of north-central Bhutan.

Where glacial movement temporary blocks riverflows, downstream areas may be threatened by glacial lake outburst flood ("GLOFs"). Although GLOFs are not a new phenomenon in Bhutan, their frequency has risen in the past three decades. Significant GLOFs occurred in 1957, 1960, 1968 and 1994, devastating lives and property downstream. According to the Bhutan Department of Energy however, the majority of rivers in Bhutan are more susceptible to fluctuation with changing rainfall patterns than to flooding directly attributable to glacier or snow melt.

For public safety, these glaciers and glacial lakes are maintained by the Ministry of Economic Affairs' Department of Geology and Mines, an executive (cabinet) agency of the government of Bhutan. The Department, as part of its environmental "mitigation projects," aims to lower the levels of glacial lakes and thereby avert GLOF-related disaster. One such glacial lake mitigation project, for example, aimed to lower water levels by five meters over three years. The Department uses silent explosives and other means it considers environmentally friendly in order to minimize the ecological impact of its mitigation projects. These projects, however, remain difficult to conduct because of the weather, terrain, and relative lack of oxygen at the glacial lakes' altitudes. As of September 2010, GLOF early warning systems were slated for installation by mid-2011 in Punakha and Wangdue Phodrang Districts at a cost of USD4.2 million.

Lists of lakes

List of non-glacial lakes
Naturally occurring mountain lakes, though today fewer than glacial lakes, include several historically and spiritually relevant bodies of water.

List of glacial lakes
Glacial lakes in Bhutan far outnumber other kinds of lakes, and pose a particular risk to those living downstream in the event of a GLOF. Many of these lakes have appeared or grown after climate change, and the frequency at which they emit flood waters has increased. in recent history.

Below is a list of the major glacial lakes in Bhutan. Many lakes appear in clusters, and may someday merge; for example, he numerous glacial lakes of Laya and Lunana Gewogs lie mostly within Jigme Dorji National Park along a handful of major glaciers.

See also
Geography of Bhutan
Glaciers of Bhutan
List of rivers of Bhutan

References

 
Lakes
Bhutan